The 2017 J.League Asia Challenge was a series of friendly association football tournaments that began on 24 January and ended on 26 January. It was organized by the Japan Professional Football League. The tournament is set to be a in round-robin tournament format with all matches being held at the Rajamangala Stadium in Bangkok, Thailand on 24 and 26 January.

In December 2016, Japanese teams, Kashima Antlers and Yokohama F. Marinos  were confirmed to play in this tournament with Thai teams, Bangkok United and Suphanburi.

Teams

Venues
All matches held at the Rajamangala Stadium in Bangkok, Thailand

Squads

Fixtures and results
All times are Thailand Standard Time (UTC+7).

Match Day 1

Match Day 2

Media coverage
 True Sport, True 4U

References

Thai football friendly trophies
2017 in Thai football
2017 in Japanese football
Sport in Bangkok
January 2017 sports events in Asia